Rogue (originally Rogue Pictures) is an American independent production company founded in 1998 by Matt Wall and Patrick Gunn, originally started off as a genre film label of the Universal-affiliated independent film studio October Films and was based in Universal City, California. It was known to produce action, thriller, and horror films.

It was owned by October Films from 1998 to 1999, after which it was merged with Gramercy Pictures to form USA Films until it's original defunct year of 2000. In 2004, Rogue was revived by Focus Features, which retained the studio until 2009, when it was acquired by Relativity Media. In June 2012, Rogue and Relativity Media sold 30 of their films to Manchester Library Company, which was acquired by Vine Alternative Investments in April 2017.

History

Original October Films era (1998–2000) 
On April 2, 1998, Rogue Pictures was formed as a division of Universal-led independent film label October Films, led by Patrick Gunn and Matt Wall in order to release genre films, to compete with its own Dimension Films label. Rogue's theatrical releases, much in the same manner like Dimension did, that would be handled by its parent company October Films, with video and television sales handled by October Films' parent company Universal Pictures, and all foreign sales would be handled by another Universal-affiliated subsidiary Good Machine.

One of the first film projects/script acquisitions greenlit by Rogue was the film Cherry Falls, while the first acquisition by October via the Rogue label was the film Orgazmo, although PolyGram Video handled the video rights of the film. The genre's predecessor was the October Films-affiliated production label Mad Dog Pictures, which was designed to release genre films. The Rogue name was dropped in 2000 after October Films was absorbed into USA Films following the merger with Gramercy Pictures.

Focus Features/Universal era (2004–2008) 
In 2004, the name and branding was revived as part of Universal-owned Focus Features, with a goal of "high-quality suspense, action, thriller and urban features with mainstream appeal and franchise potential". The revived Rogue Pictures would be led by the same team who led the Focus Features group, rather than having its own dedicated staff.

In 2005, Universal expanded the company's operations to become a stand-alone division with a new goal of releasing ten films annually. Later that year, Universal and Rogue signed a deal with newly formed Intrepid Pictures to produce, co-finance, and distribute films for five years. In 2007, distribution and marketing of Rogue Pictures films were moved to Universal in company-wide shifts to accommodate Focus Features, putting Rogue Pictures under greater control of the parent company.

Relativity Media and independent company era (2008–present) 

In 2008, Relativity Media approached Universal about buying the company, a move described in the entertainment media as "bold."  The following year, Relativity completed acquisition of the company. At the time of purchase, Rogue Pictures had more than two dozen titles in its library, four upcoming films, and more than thirty projects in development. This deal was part of Relativity Media reupping its agreemeent with Universal Pictures that would extend until 2015, and Universal would retain a distribution stake in future Rogue films. On May 7, 2009, Relativity decided to turn the Rogue branding into a consumer brand that was used by the studio.

Films

References 

Universal Pictures
Film production companies of the United States
Mass media companies established in 1998
Mass media companies established in 2004
Film distributors of the United States
2000 disestablishments in California
American independent film studios
Former General Electric subsidiaries
Former Vivendi subsidiaries